Ga East Municipal District is one of the twenty-nine districts in Greater Accra Region, Ghana. Originally it was formerly part of the then-larger Ga District in 1988, until the eastern part of the district was split off to create Ga East District in 2004; thus the remaining part has been renamed as Ga West District. It was later elevated to municipal district assembly status on 29 February 2008 to become Ga East Municipal District, until the eastern part of the district was split off to create La-Nkwantanang-Madina Municipal District on 28 June 2012; thus the remaining part has been retained as Ga East Municipal District. The municipality is located in the western part of Greater Accra Region and has Abokobi as its capital town.

Population
The 2021 population based Ghana Statistical Service record is 283,379.

Geography
Ga East Municipal District is bordered on the north by the Akuapim South District in the Eastern Region of Ghana. It is bordered on its other three sides by other districts in the Greater Accra Region of Ghana. To the west is the Ga West District, to the south Accra Metropolis District and in the east the Tema Metropolis District.

Settlements
The towns in the district include: Abokobi the capital, Dome, Madina, Taifa, and the villages in the district include: Ashongman, Boi, Ayi Mensa, Bansa, Haatso, Kwabenya, Oyarifa and Pantang.

Abokobi is an important town historically as Presbyterian missionaries set up a mission here. It is still an important centre for the Presbyterian Church of Ghana. Madina is the biggest market town in the district. Kwabenya is the location of the Ghana Atomic Energy Commission.

Health
There is a large psychiatry hospital at Pantang, which includes a psychiatry nursing training school.

Sources
 
 GhanaDistricts.com

References

Accra

Greater Accra Region

Districts of Greater Accra Region